The Electorate of Mainz ( or), previously known in English as Mentz and by its French name Mayence, was one of the most prestigious and influential states of the Holy Roman Empire. In the Roman Catholic hierarchy, the Archbishop-Elector of Mainz was also the Primate of Germany, a purely honorary dignity that was unsuccessfully claimed from time to time by other archbishops. There were only two other ecclesiastical Prince-electors in the Empire: the Electorate of Cologne and the Electorate of Trier.

The Archbishop-Elector of Mainz was also archchancellor of Germany (one of the three component titular kingdoms of the Holy Roman Empire, the other two being Italy and Burgundy) and, as such, ranked first among all ecclesiastical and secular princes of the Empire, and was second only to the Emperor. His political role, particularly as an intermediary between the Estates of the Empire and the Emperor, was considerable.

History 

The episcopal see was established in ancient Roman times in the city of Mainz, which had been a Roman provincial capital, Moguntiacum. The first bishops before the 4th century have legendary names, beginning with Crescens. 
The first verifiable Bishop of Mainz was Martinus in 343. The ecclesiastical and secular importance of Mainz dates from the accession of St. Boniface to the see in 747. Boniface was previously an archbishop though without an assigned see, but that ecclesiastical status did not immediately devolve upon the see itself until his successor Lullus; during his reign Mainz became an archdiocese, in 781. Another early bishop of Mainz was Aureus of Mainz.

The territory of the Electorate included several non-contiguous blocks of territory: lands near Mainz on both the left and right banks of the Rhine; territory along the Main River above Frankfurt (including the district of Aschaffenburg); the Eichsfeld region in Lower Saxony and Thuringia; and the territory around Erfurt in Thuringia.

As was generally the case in the Holy Roman Empire, the territory of a prince-bishopric or archbishopric differed from that of the corresponding diocese or archdiocese, which was the purely spiritual jurisdiction of the prince-bishop or archbishop. During the early modern age, the archdiocese of Mainz (see map below) was the largest ecclesiastical province of Germany, covering Mainz and 10 suffragant dioceses.

In 1802, Mainz lost its archiepiscopal character. Dalberg retained the Aschaffenburg area as the Principality of Aschaffenburg. In 1810 Dalberg merged Aschaffenburg, Frankfurt, Wetzlar, Hanau, and Fulda, to form the new Grand Duchy of Frankfurt in 1810. Dalberg resigned in 1813 and in 1815 the Congress of Vienna divided his territories between the Kingdom of Bavaria, the Electorate of Hesse-Kassel (or Hesse-Cassel), the Grand Duchy of Hesse and the Free City of Frankfurt.

The modern Roman Catholic Diocese of Mainz was founded in 1802 when Mainz lost its archdiocese status and its territory west of the Rhine River became a mere diocese within the territory of France. In 1814 its jurisdiction was extended over the territory of Hesse-Darmstadt. Since then it has had two cardinals and via various concordats was allowed to retain the medieval tradition of the cathedral chapter electing a successor to the bishop.

See also 
 Electorate of Cologne
 Electorate of Trier

References

External links 
  of the modern Diocese
 Map of the Archbishopric of Mainz in 1789

 
780 establishments
1803 disestablishments in the Holy Roman Empire
Dioceses established in the 8th century
Electoral Rhenish Circle
Electorates of the Holy Roman Empire
Former states and territories of Bavaria
Former states and territories of Hesse
Former states and territories of Rhineland-Palatinate
History of Catholicism in Germany
Electorate
Prince-bishoprics of the Holy Roman Empire in Germany
Former monarchies of Europe